Kati Psinete (Greek: Κάτι Ψήνεται) (meaning Something's cooking) is a popular cookery show. It's the Greek edition of the show Come Dine with Me (UK). It began airing on Alpha TV in 2009 for 8 seasons. From January 2019 it broadcasting on ANT1 TV and is continuing today with great success, according to AGB.

External links

Alpha TV original programming
2009 Greek television series debuts
Cooking television series
2000s Greek television series
2010s Greek television series
Come Dine
Greek reality television series
Greek television series based on British television series